Tipula obsoleta is a species of cranefly.

Distribution
Widespread throughout the West Palaearctic.

References

 

Tipulidae
Diptera of Europe
Insects described in 1818